Moshe Abutbul may refer to:

 Moshe Abutbul (footballer) (born 1984), Israeli association football player
 Moshe Abutbul (politician) (born 1965), Israeli politician